Suchitra Ramadurai, known by the mononym Suchitra, is an Indian radio jockey, popular playback singer, songwriter, composer, voice artist, dubbing artist and film actress. She has sung in multiple languages including Tamil, Malayalam, Kannada and Telugu.

Early life
Suchitra was born in Chennai, Tamil Nadu, India, as the daughter of Ramadurai and Padmaja. She has a sister named, Sunitha. Suchitra is a BSc graduate from Mar Ivanios College (Trivandrum). Later on she moved to Coimbatore for her MBA from PSG Institute of Management. She was part of a music band at PSG.

Career
Suchitra joined Sify for a year, after graduating. She responded to an ad for the post of an RJ in Radio Mirchi. She became known as Rj Suchi, with her popular morning show Hello Chennai. Her distinct and bold voice made her very popular with the younger crowd. She still does a radio show called Flight983 on Radio Mirchi, on Sunday evenings (7–9 pm). The show deals with interesting international happenings.

She started singing after a few years as RJ. She also worked as a dubbing artist for popular heroines like Shriya Saran and Lakshmi Rai.

Her career as a playback singer now spans Tamil, Telugu, Kannada and Malayalam films and she has several hits in all these languages to her credit. She sang her first song for the movie, Lesa Lesa under the composition of Harris Jayaraj and her co-singer was the legendary, K. S. Chitra. Suchitra is a sought-after performer at corporate and other such stage shows. She has also been appreciated for her honest and positive-humour-filled judging at reality shows like Vijay TV's Airtel Super Singer, Sun TV's Sun Singer, Asianet's Music India, and Bol Baby Bol on Gemini TV and Surya TV. 'Music I Like', an album of Suchitra's renditions of Mahakavi Bharatiyaar's poetry, set to contemporary tunes and music, released by Universal Music, was a turning point in her career.

Suchitra is now a singer-songwriter as well, composing music on her own and in collaboration with Singer Ranjith. Her YouTube channel 'Suchislife' has all her updated work.

She wrote a short story, a graphic illustration of an episode in the life of a black peppercorn called Kuru-Milaku, called "The Runaway Peppercorn".

After her Twitter page was hacked in 2016, and the pictures and videos released by the hacker went viral under #suchileaks, following a spate of bad press owing to the fact that she only released a statement on Sun News saying she was focused on shutting the page down, Suchitra left for London to pursue culinary arts at Le Cordon Bleu.

In 2020, Suchitra took part in the fourth season of the Tamil reality television show, Bigg Boss Tamil hosted by Kamal Haasan. She entered the show on day 28 as a new contestant and was evicted on day 49.

Personal life
Suchitra was married to actor Karthik Kumar between 2005 and 2017. On 7 March 2017, she applied for divorce.

Filmography

Actress

Dubbing artist

Discography

Tamil songs

Complete list of songs

Television

Awards
International Tamil Film Awards (ITFA)
 Best Female Playback Singer – Mankatha

BIG Telugu Music Awards
 Best Singer of the Year – Businessman

Filmfare Awards South 2013
 Filmfare Award for Best Female Playback Singer – Telugu for the song 'Sir Osthara' from Businessman
 Nominated: Filmfare Award for Best Female Playback Singer– Telugu for the song 'Nijamena' from Brindavanam

2nd South Indian International Movie Awards
 Nominated: SIIMA Award for Best Female Playback Singer|Best Female Playback Singer for the song 'Sir Osthara' from Businessman

References

External links
 Suchitra : I can sound sweet, sexy, bold or sensual (2010 archived copy)
 Interview with RJ Suchitra

Living people
Tamil actresses
Indian women playback singers
Tamil playback singers
Kannada playback singers
Telugu playback singers
Indian radio presenters
Actresses in Tamil cinema
Singers from Chennai
Indian women radio presenters
Actresses from Chennai
21st-century Indian actresses
21st-century Indian women singers
21st-century Indian singers
Women musicians from Tamil Nadu
Bigg Boss (Tamil TV series) contestants
1982 births